The Algonquin-class patrol boat were a class of cutters built for the United States Coast Guard in the early 1930s. These ships were placed under United States Navy control during World War II.

The cutters in this class were:
 
 
 
 
 
 

Escanaba was the lead ship in this class of Coast Guard cutters, but she exploded and sank while serving as part of the Greenland Patrol.

References

Patrol ship classes
Algonquin-class cutters
Ships of the United States Coast Guard